Klaarstroom is a village in Prince Albert Local Municipality in the Western Cape province of South Africa.

It is situated at the northern end of Meiringspoort, about 60 km east of Prince Albert and 95 km north-west of Uniondale. Originally named Pietersburg, its present name, Afrikaans for 'clear stream', probably refers to waters flowing from the Swartberg into the lowlands.

References

Populated places in the Prince Albert Local Municipality